Battle of Maryang-san refers to several engagements during the Korean War:

 First Battle of Maryang-san, in October 1951
 Second Battle of Maryang-san, in November 1951